This is a list of erhu performers and contains a non-exhaustive list of notable players of the erhu, a bowed musical instrument with two strings.

Erhu performers 
The list is organized alphabetically.

Abing (c. 1893-1950)
Alan Dawa Dolma
Jiebing Chen
ChthoniC
George Gao or Gao Shaoqing
Guo Gan
Tina Guo
The Hsu-nami
Eyvind Kang
Nicole Ge Li
Liu Mingyuan (1931–1996)
Liu Tianhua (1895–1932)
Ma Xiaohui
Min Huifen (1945–2014)
Shen Sinyan
Ubiquitous Synergy Seeker
Francis Wong
Teresa Wong
Zhou Yu
Dinesh Subasinghe

References